Justo Botelho (born 20 October 1935) is a Brazilian modern pentathlete. He competed at the 1960 Summer Olympics.

References

External links
 

1935 births
Living people
Brazilian male modern pentathletes
Olympic modern pentathletes of Brazil
Modern pentathletes at the 1960 Summer Olympics
Sportspeople from Minas Gerais
Pan American Games silver medalists for Brazil
Pan American Games medalists in modern pentathlon
Modern pentathletes at the 1963 Pan American Games
Medalists at the 1963 Pan American Games
20th-century Brazilian people